The voiced retroflex sibilant affricate is a type of consonantal sound, used in some spoken languages. It occurs in such languages as Polish (the laminal affricate dż) and Northwest Caucasian languages (apical).

Features
Features of the voiced retroflex affricate:

Occurrence

See also
 Index of phonetics articles

Notes

References

External links
 

Retroflex consonants
Affricates
Pulmonic consonants
Voiced oral consonants
Central consonants